Hajari Mahadev Mandir or Hajari Mahadev temple is a Hindu temple. dedicated to Lord Shiva, located in the town of Sarsai Nawar, about 4 km from Etawah district, Uttar Pradesh, India.

The Temple
The temple is various Devas the Mahabharat Period. Pandav Setup in the form of Shivalinga is the presiding deity of the temple. Mela Festival At Hajari Mahadev Temple Sarsai Nawar.

References

External links

Hindu temples in Uttar Pradesh
Buildings and structures in Etawah district